GroupServer is a computer software application from OnlineGroups.net for managing electronic mailing lists.

GroupServer is a Web-based mailing list manager designed for large sites. It provides email interaction like a traditional mailing list manager but also supports reading, searching, and posting of messages and files via the Web. Users have forum-style profiles, and can manage their email addresses and other settings using the same Web interface. It supports features such as Atom feeds, a basic CMS, statistics, multiple verified addresses per user, and bounce detection, and is able to be heavily customized.

GroupServer is coded primarily in Zope and Python and currently maintained by OnlineGroups.net. GroupServer is free software, distributed under the GNU General Public License.

History 

GroupServer was first released in 2005. It was developed by OnlineGroups.net. Initial open source release support came via E-Democracy.org with funding from the UK Local e-Democracy National Project.

Features 
GroupServer is free software for managing electronic mail discussion lists with an optimized web interface. It runs on Linux and most Unix-like systems, and requires Python 2.1.3 or newer. GroupServer works with Unix style mail servers such as Postfix.

Features include:
 Read and post messages via the web.
 Administer membership and post in one web interface.
 Share uploaded files.
 Search messages and files.
 Multiple email addresses on a profile.
 Multiple groups on a site
 Skinnable and customisable.

See also 

 List of mailing list software
 Google Groups
 Yahoo! Groups
 Electronic mailing list
 LISTSERV
 Mailing list

References

Further reading

Reviews 
 Meet Open Source Server Messaging Needs With GroupServer
 Open Source Alternative to Mailman and Google Groups Released

External links
 GroupServer homepage

Free software programmed in Python
Mailing list software for Linux
Free mailing list software
Free email software
Email